Uigg is a settlement in Prince Edward Island.

Communities in Queens County, Prince Edward Island